Animation On Display was an animation convention in Santa Clara, California at the Santa Clara Convention Center containing animation screenings, cosplay, panels, guests, vendors, fandom, comics, music and more in reference to East Asian and American culture.

Formerly Anime Overdose and then AOD: The San Francisco Animation Convention, Animation On Display is managed by the Federation for the Promotion of Animation and is a non-profit organization. It is the goal of the FPA to increase awareness and understanding of the art of animation and its related interests in a fun and exciting family-oriented format and to enable those interested in animation to meet and share their interests.

History
The Anime Overdose convention began in 2003 at Santa Clara University. As the convention expanded, it was moved to the Nob Hill neighborhood of San Francisco. Soon joining forces  with several other animation themed groups in the area, they decided to create a larger scale event together which started the foundation for AOD. The event was thus named "Animation On Display" in 2007. In 2010 it moved to the Japantown area in San Francisco, where it stayed briefly. before in 2014, moving to The Hyatt in Burlingame, California located near the San Francisco International Airport. In 2016, AOD moved to the Santa Clara Convention Center. The next year, it moved to the Marriott in Santa Clara, California, its final location for 2017. On November 22, 2017, the convention announced on its Facebook page it would be ceasing operations effective immediately.

See also
List of multigenre conventions

References

External links
Animation On Display official web site
AOD 2017 on AnimeCons.com

Defunct multigenre conventions
San Francisco Bay Area conventions
Recurring events established in 2003
Recurring events disestablished in 2017